Gellar may refer to:

Gellar-e Mohammad Hasan, a village in Ardabil Province, Iran
Gellar-e Mohammad Taqi, a village in Ardabil Province, Iran
Sarah Michelle Gellar, an American actress
Caitlyn Gellar, a fictional character in Camp Rock
James Gellar, a fictional character in Dexter

See also
Geller, a surname